Prince Yeonsan (연산군 – Yeonsan gun) is a 1961 South Korean film directed by Shin Sang-ok. Among several awards including Best Actor and Best Actress, it was chosen as Best Film at the first Grand Bell Awards ceremony.

Plot
A historical drama about Yeonsangun of Joseon as a prince trying to restore the status of his mother, the
deposed and executed Queen Yun.

Cast
Shin Young-kyun as Prince Yeonsan
Shin Seong-il
Kim Dong-won as Seongjong
Ju Jeung-ryu: Yun Pyebi, the deposed queen
Han Eun-jin as Mother of Yun
Heo Jang-kang
Kim Jin-kyu
Do Kum-bong as Jang Nok-su
Jeon Ok
Choi Nam-hyeon
Kim Hie-gab
Lee Ye-chun
Namkoong Won
Hwang Jeong-su
Lee Min-ja

Contemporary reviews
November 22, 1961. "[영화제작계 근황]", Kyunghyang Sinmun
December 3, 1961. "촬영소식/「연산군」전편" 신정에 개봉/상영 5시간의 장척물  신문 Hankook Ilbo
December 3, 1961. "[연예] 원커트/ 발랄한 용자 / 엄앵란양", Hankook Ilbo
December 6, 1961. "[스폿트라이트] 한숨에 내달린 출세가도", The Dong-a Ilbo
December 30, 1961. "국산대작이 볼만 / -신협-제작영화도 이색 / 정초 시내 개봉관 -프로-", Kyunghyang Sinmun

Notes

External links

Bibliography

 
 
 

1961 films
Films directed by Shin Sang-ok
1960s Korean-language films
South Korean biographical films
South Korean historical films
1960s biographical films
1960s historical films